ROCAF may refer to:

Republic of China Air Force
Republic of China Armed Forces